Slab Creek is a stream in the U.S. state of West Virginia.

Slab Creek was named for a nearby settler's house which was built of slabs.

See also
List of rivers of West Virginia

References

Rivers of Ritchie County, West Virginia
Rivers of West Virginia